Fulvio Rocchi (born 7 August 1909, date of death unknown) was an Argentine sports shooter. He competed in the trap event at the 1952 Summer Olympics.

References

1909 births
Year of death missing
Argentine male sport shooters
Olympic shooters of Argentina
Shooters at the 1952 Summer Olympics
Place of birth missing
Pan American Games medalists in shooting
Pan American Games gold medalists for Argentina
Pan American Games silver medalists for Argentina
Shooters at the 1951 Pan American Games
Medalists at the 1951 Pan American Games